Michele C. Edmondson is a United States Air Force major general who serves as the commander of Second Air Force since July 30, 2021. She most recently served as the Commandant of Cadets for the U.S. Air Force Academy from 2019 to 2021.

Early life and education
Edmondson graduated from the University of Florida, Gainesville with a Bachelor of Science in Aerospace Engineering in 1992, along with a commission as a Second Lieutenant through Air Force ROTC.

Career
Edmondson has been a Space Operations Officer since 1992.  From June 2012 to May 2014, she commanded the 381st Training Group at Vandenberg AFB, California.  From June 2014 to May 2015, she commanded Air Force Basic Military Training at Joint Base San Antonio-Lackland.  From June 2015 to June 2017, she commanded the 81st Training Wing at Keesler AFB, and then served as the Senior Executive Officer to the Vice Chief of Staff of the Air Force until 2018.  Edmondson was the Director of Space Policy for the National Security Council until May 2019, when she became the Commandant of Cadets at the U.S. Air Force Academy. On April 7, 2021, it was announced that Edmondson would become the next commander of the Second Air Force.

References

 

 

 

Female generals of the United States Air Force
Brigadier generals
United States Air Force Academy faculty
Year of birth missing (living people)
Living people
American women academics
21st-century American women